Abdul Kareem Salah Al-Awad (born 22 August 1953) is a Kuwaiti former sprinter. He competed in the men's 100 metres at the 1976 Summer Olympics.

References

External links
 

1953 births
Living people
Kuwaiti Muslims
Athletes (track and field) at the 1976 Summer Olympics
Kuwaiti male sprinters
Olympic athletes of Kuwait
Place of birth missing (living people)